Gaisano Malls (also branded as GMall) are shopping malls owned by DSG Sons Group, Inc. based in  Davao City, Mindanao, Philippines.

History
In the 1970s, Modesta Singson-Gaisano established White Gold Department Store in Cebu City. After her death in 1981, her five sons - David, Stephen, Henry, Victor and John, pursued their respective retail operations.

Her son, David S. Gaisano, took over the operations of White Gold. In addition, he established DSG Sons Group, Inc. which opened shopping malls in Mindanao under the Gaisano Mall and GMall brands in Davao City (including Toril), Digos, General Santos, Tagum, and Cebu City. GMall's Mindanao branches are some of the biggest shopping malls in the island.

Branches

References

External links
 Gaisano Malls official website

Shopping malls in the Philippines
Real estate companies established in 1970
Retail companies established in 1970
Philippine brands